Diamond is Jaci Velasquez's seventh studio album, released in 2012 on Inpop Records. The producers of this album are Craig Swift and Chris Bevins, who are both in the band Salvador, along with Jaci's husband, Nic Gonzalez.

Reception
Diamond received mixed reviews. AllMusic notes that "the result (of the mixed genres of this album) is a somewhat jarring experience...In that respect, Diamond feels a little too self-conscious, too concerned about what the commercial prospects of the album would be rather than making a bold artistic statement". Roger Gelwicks of Jesus Freak Hideout.com says that "Diamond doesn't feel very surprising in its execution, although this is probably the most radio-friendly Velasquez has ever been...songs with innovation and vibrancy just aren't to be found here". Both Allmusic and Jesus Freak Hideout gave this album 3 out of 5 stars.

Track listing

Personnel 
 Jaci Velasquez – lead vocals, backing vocals 
 Chris Bevins – acoustic piano, keyboards, synth bass, percussion, string arrangements
 Craig Swift – keyboards, programming, synth bass, saxophones, horn arrangements, string arrangements, backing vocals 
 Nic Gonzales – acoustic guitars, backing vocals 
 Mike Payne – guitars, electric guitars 
 Ron Robinson – guitars 
 Josh Gonzales – bass guitar 
 Tommy Lee – bass guitar 
 Ben Cordonero – drums
 Garth Justice – drums 
 Elliot Torres – percussion 
 Justin Carpenter – trombone 
 Leif Shires – trumpet 
 David Angell – strings
 David Davidson – strings, string arrangements 
 Jason Barton – backing vocals 
 Michelle Swift – backing vocals

Production 
 Andrew Patton – executive producer, A&R 
 Chris Bevins – producer, engineer 
 Craig Swift – producer, engineer 
 Sean Moffitt – mixing 
 Steve Xavier – mix assistant 
 Andrew Mendelson – mastering 
 Daniel McCarthy – package design, layout 
 Micah Kandros – photography 
 Betsy Jones – wardrobe stylist 
 Jessica Mallum – hair stylist, make-up

Charts

References

2012 albums
Jaci Velasquez albums
Inpop Records albums